Nocardiopsis terrae  is a Gram-positive, halophilic, facultatively alkaliphilic and obligately aerobic bacterium from the genus of Nocardiopsis which has been isolated from saline soil from the Qaidam Basin in the Qinghai Province in China.

References

External links
Type strain of Nocardiopsis terrae at BacDive -  the Bacterial Diversity Metadatabase	

Actinomycetales
Bacteria described in 2012